John William Inglis (born )) is an English first-class cricketer, who played one match for Yorkshire County Cricket Club in 2000.  A right-handed batsman, he batted at number three and scored 2 runs in both innings against the West Indians at Headingley, a match Yorkshire lost by ten wickets.

Inglis was born in Ripon, Yorkshire.  He played in two Under-19 ODIs for England Under-19s against Australia U 19s in 1999, in the Minor Counties Trophy for Yorkshire Cricket Board (1998), in the Second Eleven Championship for Yorkshire Second XI (1998-2000) and for Durham Second XI (2001), the Yorkshire Academy (1996-1997) and Harrogate C.C. (2005).

Inglis is now semi retired from cricket, he appears occasionally for Beckwithshaw C.C, based on the outskirts of Harrogate, Yorkshire, whilst running a successful Building firm which he founded with his late father Bill.

References

External links
Cricinfo Profile
Cricket Archive Statistics

1979 births
Living people
Cricketers from Ripon
English cricketers
Yorkshire cricketers